Wayne Horsburgh (born 11 June 1955, in Benalla, Victoria) is an Australian country music entertainer. He currently lives near Sydney, Australia, and Branson, Missouri, United States.

Horsburgh's career began at the age of 11 when he formed his own dance band in rural Victoria[1]. In 1978, he was asked by Buddy Williams (An Australian pioneer of country music)[2] to tour Australia. By 1979, Horsburgh had moved to Sydney to pursue his musical career[8].

Horsburgh is noted by fans and critics alike for his smooth voice, excellent falsetto notes, impressive vocal range, yodelling abilities, and his willingness to popularize and maintain a broad range of traditional country music art forms.[3][4]

His influences include Slim Whitman, Frank Ifield, Jim Reeves and Marty Robbins.[4][5]
  
Setting his sights even higher, Horsburgh performed for a season in the United Kingdom in 1982 and investigated the US music and entertainment scene in 1984.[5]

In 1989, Horsburgh was introduced to United States' country music audiences when he performed at the Hodag Festival in Rhinelander, Wisconsin[6]. A groundswell of audience appreciation and the establishment of a US-based fan club were among the reasons Horsburgh based himself in Nashville by the mid-'90s for each American summer season[7].

The year 1997 saw yet another move for Horsburgh - this time a relocation to the live entertainment capital of the USA: Branson, Missouri[8]. In addition to a full tour schedule - predominantly in the Midwest[1]- Horsburgh has represented his home nation at the international music and cultural festival - Silver Dollar City's WorldFest - each spring since 1998.[9]

He continues to entertain on the Australian club circuit during the summer months of the southern hemisphere.[8]

In 2013 Horsburgh was inducted into the Australian Roll of Renown.

Discography

Albums

Other singles

Awards and honours

Australian Roll of Renown
The Australian Roll of Renown honours Australian and New Zealander musicians who have shaped the music industry by making a significant and lasting contribution to Country Music. It was inaugurated in 1976 and the inductee is announced at the Country Music Awards of Australia in Tamworth in January. 

|-
| 2013
| Wayne Horsburgh
| Australian Roll of Renown
|

Mo Awards
The Australian Entertainment Mo Awards (commonly known informally as the Mo Awards), were annual Australian entertainment industry awards. They recognise achievements in live entertainment in Australia from 1975 to 2016. Wayne Horsburgh won eight awards in that time.
 (wins only)
|-
| 1984
| Wayne Horsburgh 
| Male Country Entertainer of the Year
| 
|-
| 1989
| Wayne Horsburgh 
| Country Entertainer of the Yea
| 
|-
| 1990
| Wayne Horsburgh 
| Male Country Entertainer of the Yea
| 
|-
| 1995
| Wayne Horsburgh 
| Male Country Entertainer of the Yea
| 
|-
| 2007
| Wayne Horsburgh 
| Slim Dusty Country Vocal Performer of the Year
| 
|-
| 2012
| Wayne Horsburgh 
| Slim Dusty Country Act of the Year
| 
|-
|rowspan="2"|  2016
| Wayne Horsburgh 
| Country Solo/ Group or Band of the Year
| 
|-
| Wayne Horsburgh 
| Entertainer of the Year
| 
|-

References 

 

1955 births
Living people
Australian country singers
People from Benalla
Yodelers
Singers from Victoria (Australia)